List of Journals appearing during the French Revolution :

A 
 Les Actes des Apôtres (royalist) : Journiac de Saint-Méard, Suleau
 Les Annales patriotiques : Louis-Sébastien Mercier, Jean-Louis Carra
 Les Annales politiques : Simon-Nicolas-Henri Linguet
 L'Ami des citoyens : Jean-Lambert Tallien
 L'Ami des Lois: a Parisian newspaper published in 1795-1798)
 L'Ami des Théophilanthropes : Armand-Joseph Guffroy
 L'Ami du peuple : Jean-Paul Marat
 L'Ami du peuple par Leclerc : Jean-Théophile Leclerc
 L'Ami du roi : Christophe Félix Louis Ventre de la Touloubre Galart de Montjoie
 L'Anti-Fédéraliste : (Comité de salut public) inspired by Maximilien de Robespierre
 L'Anti-fédéraliste : Claude-François de Payan
 L'Apocalypse : Mirabeau
 L'Argus patriote : Charles Theveneau de Morande

B 
 La Bouche de fer : Claude Fauchet, Nicolas de Bonneville
 Bulletin du tribunal révolutionnaire : Jean-Baptiste Coffinhal

C 
 Le Chien et le Chat : Jacques René Hébert
 La Chronique de Paris : Condorcet
 La Chronique du mois : Jean-Marie Collot d'Herbois, Étienne Clavière, Condorcet
 Le Conservateur : Dominique Joseph Garat, Marie-Joseph Chénier, François Daunou
 Le Contrepoison ou préservatif contre les motions insidieuses: (journal royaliste)
  : Pierre Jacques Michel Chasles
  (1789) : François-Noël Babeuf, dit Grachus Babeuf
 Le Cosmopolite : Berthold Proli
 Courrier de l'Égypte : published in French-occupied Egypt
 Le Courier de l'Europe : Samuel Swinton, puis Radix de Sainte-Foix (propriétaires), Alphonse-Joseph Serre de la Tour, puis Charles Théveneau de Morande (directeurs)
 Le Courrier de Brabant : Camille Desmoulins
 Le Courrier de Provence : Mirabeau
 Le Courrier de Versailles à Paris et de Paris à Versailles (de 1789 à 1792) : Antoine-Joseph Gorsas

D 

 Les Dames nationales ou le Kalendrier des citoyennes : Restif de La Bretonne
 Le Défenseur de la liberté : Pierre Philippeaux

F 
 La France vue de l'armée d'Italie : Michel Regnaud de Saint-Jean d'Angély

G 
 La Gazette : Théophraste Renaudot, Fallet, Chamfort
 Il Giornale patriotico di Corsica :  Philippe Buonarrotti

H 
 Histoire des Révolutions de France et de Brabant : Camille Desmoulins

J 
 Journal de la liberté de la presse : François Noël Babeuf dite Gracchus Babeuf
 Journal de Malte : published in French-occupied Malta
 Journal de la Montagne
 Journal de l'opposition : Pierre-François Réal
 Journal de Paris : Corancez, Antoine Cadet de Vaux, Dussieux, N. Xhrouet
 Journal de Paris : Michel Louis Étienne Regnault de Saint-Jean d'Angely
 Journal de Perlet : Charles Frédéric Perlet
 Journal des amis de la Constitution : Pierre Choderlos de Laclos
 Journal des Défenseurs de la patrie
 Journal des débats
 Journal des Halles
 Journal des laboureurs : Joseph Lequinio
 Journal des lois : Charles-Nicolas Osselin
 Journal du soir sans réflexions et courriers de Paris et de Londres : Étienne Feuillant
 Le Journal du soir sans réflexions et le courrier de la capitale : Étienne Feuillant; Denis Tremblay et Jacques René Hébert
 Journal général : l'abbé Fontenai
 Journal politique et littéraire : Simon-Nicolas-Henri Linguet

L 
 La lanterne magique : Boisset
 Lettres à mes commettants : Mirabeau
 Lettres bougrement patriotiques du Père Duchêne : Antoine Lemaire

M 
 La Manufacture
 Le Mémorial : Jean-François de La Harpe, Fontanes, Vauxelles
 Le Miroir : Claude François Beaulieu (journal royaliste)
 Le Moniteur Universel : Charles-Joseph Panckouke

N 
 Nouvelles ecclésiastiques

O 
 Observateur : Gabriel Feydel
 L'Orateur du peuple : Stanislas Fréron

P 
 Le Patriote français : Jacques Pierre Brissot
 Le Père Duchesne : Jacques Hébert
 Le Père Duchêne de Jean Charles Jumel : Abbé Jean Charles Jumel
 Les Petites affiches : Pierre Bénézech
 Le Point du jour : Barère de Vieuzac
 Le Publiciste de la République française: Jacques Roux

Q 
 La Quotidienne: Coutouli et Ripert (journal royaliste)

R 
 : 
 Le Républicain : Condorcet, Thomas Paine
 Retour du Père Duchêne, premier poêlier du monde : M. de Mont-Lucy
 Le Réveil du peuple
 La Révolution de 1792 : Louis Ange Pitou
 Les Révolutions de France et de Brabant : Camille Desmoulins
 Les Révolutions de Paris : Elisée Loustalot, Sylvain Maréchal, Fabre d'Églantine, Pierre-Gaspard Chaumette, Léger-Félicité Sonthonax
 Le Rougyff ou le franc en vedette : Armand-Joseph Guffroy

S 
 La Sentinelle : Louvet, François Daunou

T 
 Le Thermomètre du jour : Jacques-Antoine Dulaure
 Le Tocsin de Liège
 La Tribune des patriotes : Camille Desmoulins, Louis-Marie Stanislas Fréron
 Le Tribun du peuple : Gracchus Babeuf

V 
 Le Vieux Cordelier : Camille Desmoulins
 Les Vitres cassées (1789) : Antoine Lemaire

References

Further reading
Léonard Gallois Histoire des journaux et des journalistes de la révolution française (1789-96): précédée d'une introduction générale. 2 vols. Paris, 1845-46 (reissued: Genève: Megariotis Reprints 197-?)  
Journaux et publications périodiques de la Révolution française, le premier Empire et la Restauration. Bibliotheca Lindesiana. Privately printed, 1911
Gérard Walter. La Révolution française vue par ses journaux. Paris: Tardy, 1948 

French Rev
 
France history-related lists